JETS – Leben am Limit is a German television series.

External links
 

1999 German television series debuts
1999 German television series endings
Aviation television series
German-language television shows
ProSieben original programming